Ostade is the surname of two Dutch brothers, both of whom were painters:
Adriaen van Ostade (1610–1685), genre painter
Isaac van Ostade (1621–1649), genre and landscape painter